The following squads were named for the 1928 Summer Olympics tournament.

Argentina

Head coach:  José Lago Millan

Belgium

Head coach:  Victor Löwenfelt

Chile

Head coach:  Frank Powell

Egypt

Head coach:

France

Head coach:  Peter Farmer

Germany

Head coach: Otto Nerz

Italy

Head coach: Augusto Rangone

Luxembourg

Head coach: Gustave Jacquemart

The following players were also named as reserves, but did not play in any matches: Jean-Baptiste Meyer, N. Weisgerber, A. Voght, Adolphe Hubert, J. Michel and J. P. Flammang

Mexico

Head coach: Alfonso Rojo

Netherlands

Head coach:  Bob Glendenning

Portugal

Head coach: Cândido de Oliveira

The following players were also named as reserves, but did not play in any matches: Francisco Silva, Francisco Moura and José João Soares

Spain

Head coach: José Ángel Berraondo

Juan Errazquin was rejected by the organizing committee because his passport listed born in Argentina and had no documents to prove his Spanish nationality.

Switzerland

Head coach:  Teddy Duckworth

Turkey

Head coach:  Béla Tóth

Uruguay

Head coach: Primo Gianotti

As José Leandro Andrade refused to travel, Eduardo Martínez was named as his substitute. However, at last hour (when the boat had already started the journey) Andrade joined his old partners.  Martínez did travel, but wasn't recorded in the Tournament list. From then he was known as "El Olímpico 23" (the 23rd Olympian).

United States

Head coach: George Burford

Yugoslavia

Head coach: Ante Pandaković

References

External links
 FIFA
 RSSSF
 List of Luxembourgian olympic footballers at ALO
 Turkey national football team: match reports 1927-1928, Walter Verani, Erdinç Sivritepe and Turkish Soccer
 Match report at FFF
 Match report at Serbian football federation
 Argentina squad at AFA
 A list of Portuguese international footballers

1928 Summer Olympics
Football at the 1928 Summer Olympics